Cale Douglas Makar (born October 30, 1998) is a Canadian professional ice hockey defenceman for the Colorado Avalanche of the National Hockey League (NHL). He was selected with the fourth overall pick by the Avalanche in the 2017 NHL Entry Draft.

After two seasons in the NCAA with the UMass Minutemen, Makar debuted in the NHL in the 2019–20 season, making an immediate impact and winning the Calder Memorial Trophy as rookie of the year. In his second professional season he was nominated for the James Norris Memorial Trophy, awarded to the league's best defenceman, and won the Norris in the following 2021–22 season.  Makar won the Stanley Cup with the Avalanche in 2022, winning the Conn Smythe Trophy as the most valuable player in the 2022 playoffs. He has been widely cited as one of the best defencemen and best players in the modern NHL.

Internationally, Makar has played for Team Canada, winning gold at the 2018 World Junior Championships.

Playing career

Junior
Makar, a Calgary native, first played within the Crowchild Blackhawks minor-hockey program before moving to play with the Northwest Calgary Athletic Association (NWCAA) Bruins at the Bantam level in 2011. He also played bantam with the Calgary Flames before moving to minor midget with the NWCAA Stampeders. Makar was originally drafted at the major junior level by the Western Hockey League (WHL)'s Medicine Hat Tigers in the eighth round, 164th overall, of the 2013 WHL Bantam Draft.

Having returned to the Calgary Flames for the minor midget level, in his only full season with the club in 2014–15, Makar led the team in scoring with 23 points in 34 league games, being named the team's Most Valuable Player and selected to the Alberta Midget Hockey League First All-Star Team. To retain his NCAA eligibility, Makar joined as an affiliate player to the Brooks Bandits of the Alberta Junior Hockey League (AJHL) at the tail end of the season, recording five points in three regular season games. In helping the Bandits reach the finals, Makar was third among defenceman in scoring with 7 points in 20 games. Having agreed to return with the Bandits in the forthcoming seasons, Makar announced his commitment to play collegiate hockey with the University of Massachusetts Amherst of the Hockey East NCAA conference on August 29, 2015.

As a 17-year-old, Makar established himself as a standout defenceman with the Bandits in 2015–16, logging 55 points in 54 games, en route to earning AJHL All-League and All-Rookie recognition. He scored 14 points in 13 games to help the Bandits claim the AJHL championship. His productive season collected AJHL and CJHL Rookie of the Year Awards, the Western Canada Cup Top Defenceman Award, and the RBC Cup Top Defenceman, Top Scorer and Most Valuable Player awards.

Makar sustained and built upon his previous success in the 2016–17 season to lead all defencemen and finished sixth among all skaters in the AJHL with 75 points (24 goals and 51 assists) in 54 games, collecting the league's MVP and top defenceman accolades. He had 16 points in 13 playoff games to help Brooks to a second straight AJHL championship and six points in five games to help the Bandits to a second-place finish in the Royal Bank Cup. He was chosen as the RBC Cup Top Defenceman and Most Valuable Player, the first player to ever be named RBC Cup MVP in back-to-back seasons. He received the CJHL Most Valuable Player Award and won the prestigious RBC National Junior A Player of the Year Award.

Through Makar's rapid rise up the rankings prior to the 2017 NHL Entry Draft, he was considered a top prospect and one of the top defencemen available. He was described as a dynamic skater that creates offence whenever he is on the ice. Makar was ultimately selected fourth overall by the Colorado Avalanche, the second defenceman selected in the draft, after third overall selection Miro Heiskanen. Makar became the highest drafted player to come straight from the AJHL, and just the second in the first round since Joe Colborne in 2008.

College
Despite his blue-chip prospect status, Makar opted to remain loyal to his commitment in joining the rebuilding UMass Minuteman program for the 2017–18 season. As a freshman, he immediately assumed a top-pairing role, alongside Jake McLaughlin, and recorded his first collegiate point in his debut against Arizona State University on October 6, 2017. He recorded his first goal in a 4–0 victory over Merrimack College on October 27, 2017.

While showing an adjustment period to the collegiate level, Makar raised his game through the new year to help the Minutemen to turnaround their program to make the post-season before suffering a 7–2 defeat to the hands of Northeastern University. He finished fifth on the team in scoring, second amongst defenceman, with 5 goals and 16 assists for 21 points in 34 games. He was selected with co-Rookie of the Year honors by the New England Hockey Writers Association and by finishing ninth in defenceman scoring in the Hockey East, he was selected to the conference's All-Rookie and Third All-Star Teams.

With the season concluded and despite interest from the Colorado Avalanche in turning pro, Makar opted to continue his development in returning for his sophomore season with UMass in 2018–19. That season, Makar became the first Minutemen honored as Hockey East Player of the Year after he led the league in scoring and finished second in the conference. Makar was also selected for the Hockey East First All-Star Team and named a Hobey Baker Award finalist. On April 12, Makar was announced the winner of the Hobey Baker. The following night, Makar and the Minutemen lost 3–0 to University of Minnesota Duluth in the Frozen Four final.

Professional

Debut and Calder Trophy (2019–2021)
On April 14, 2019, the Avalanche signed Makar to a three-year, entry-level contract. He scored his first career NHL goal with his first shot in the league in his debut a day later, during Game 3 of the first round of the 2019 Stanley Cup playoffs against the Calgary Flames. In so doing, he became the first defenceman to score a playoff goal in his NHL debut.

Makar made the Avalanche opening line up for the 2019–20 season and he scored his first career regular season goal in a 6–1 win over the Vegas Golden Knights. He was subsequently named a Third Star of the Week for the week of November 10, becoming the first Avalanche rookie to earn the honor. On November 12, 2019, in a 4–0 road win against the Winnipeg Jets, Makar became the second Avalanche defenceman to record 18 points in 18 games as a rookie. However, he suffered an upper body injury in a game against the Boston Bruins on December 7 and was listed as day-to-day. At the time of his injury, he was leading rookies in scoring with 28 points in 29 games. Makar returned to the Avalanche’s lineup on December 27, where he recorded an assist in the 6–4 loss to the Minnesota Wild. On January 18, 2020, Makar set a new Avalanche franchise record with his 11th goal of the season, besting John-Michael Liles record for most goals by a rookie defenceman. As a result of his play, he was named a Calder Memorial Trophy finalist alongside Quinn Hughes and Dominik Kubalík. During the second round of the NHL playoffs, Makar surpassed the record for most points in a postseason by a rookie defenceman, before it was beaten by Hughes the following night. Following the conclusion of the regular season, Makar was awarded the Calder Memorial Trophy as the rookie of the year. After the 2020–21 season Makar was named a finalist for the James Norris Memorial Trophy and finished second in the voting for the trophy.

Stanley Cup, Norris and Conn Smythe trophies (2021–present)
On July 24, 2021, Makar signed a six-year $54 million extension with the Avalanche. On October 28, Makar scored two points (one goal and one assist) in a 4–3 win against the St. Louis Blues, in doing so, he scored his 100th point in just 108 games, which tied him with Sergei Zubov as the sixth-fastest defenceman to accomplish this feat. On March 25, Makar scored his 24th goal of the 2021–22 season in a 6–3 win against the Philadelphia Flyers, breaking the Avalanche's single-season record for goals scored by a defenceman. He finished the season with 28 goals, the most by a defenceman in the NHL since Brent Burns in the 2016–17 season, and 58 assists. 19 of his 28 goals were at even strength. Makar was named a James Norris Memorial Trophy finalist for the second consecutive season. He won the Norris Trophy, the first Avalanche defenceman to do so, and finished eighth in voting for the Hart Memorial Trophy, awarded by the Professional Hockey Writers' Association to the league's most valuable player.

The Avalanche finished first in the Western Conference, and second in the league overall, advancing into the 2022 Stanley Cup playoffs to meet the Nashville Predators in the first round. Makar scored 10 points in a four-game sweep of the Predators, setting a record for points by a defenceman in the first four games of a postseason. Teammate Nathan MacKinnon remarked, "he might be the best player in the league right now." He would amass a further 19 points in the next three rounds, as the Avalanche ousted the Blues and the Edmonton Oilers before defeating the two-time and defending champion Tampa Bay Lightning in the Cup Finals. Makar finished the playoffs with a team-leading 29 points, the fourth-most for a defenceman in a single postseason in league history. He was awarded the Conn Smythe Trophy as the most valuable player in the postseason, and became only the third defenceman to win the Norris and Conn Smythe Trophies in the same season, after Bobby Orr (1970 and 1972) and Niklas Lidström (2002).

Makar recorded 20 points in the first 17 games of the 2022–23 season, his 20th being a power play goal scored in a November 21, 2022, game against the Dallas Stars. This was his 200th career point in 195 games, the fastest pace of any NHL defenceman to that milestone. Previous record holder Sergei Zubov reached the mark in 207 games. He attracted notice when, during a December 19 game against the New York Islanders, he convinced the referee to rescind a tripping penalty that had been incorrectly assessed against Islanders forward Mathew Barzal, with Makar clarifying that he had fallen on his own rather than being tripped. Barzal remarked that it was "obviously, good sportsmanship on his part. I don't know if I would have done the same, to be honest with you."

International play

Makar was first selected by Hockey Canada to compete for Team Canada West at the World Junior A Challenge in 2015 and 2016. He was selected to the Tournament All-Star Team in both years and helped Canada West to a gold medal in 2015. Unable to defend the gold medal, Makar followed up by setting a tournament single-game record for points by a defenceman in 2016. Makar appeared for Team Canada at the World Junior Summer Showcase in Plymouth, Michigan. He had one goal and one assist during the exhibition. His single goal came at a pivotal time on August 4, 2017, against Sweden, tying the game 4–4 in the third period. The marker re-energized the Canadians as they registered three more goals to pull off a 7–4 win.

Makar was selected to Canada's under-20 team for the 2018 World Junior Championships in Buffalo, New York, winning gold. Makar finished the tournament leading all defenceman with three goals and eight points in seven games, and was the only Canadian named to the All-Tournament Team.

Following the World Juniors, Makar reportedly turned down an invite to join the Canadian senior team for the 2018 Winter Olympics in Pyeongchang in order to focus on his season at UMass, as he would have had to miss three weeks for the tournament.

Personal life
Makar is the son of Gary Makar and Laura MacGregor. He was named after former NHL player Cale Hulse. His younger brother Taylor plays at UMass-Amherst, which Cale also attended, and was also drafted by the Avalanche in the seventh round of the 2021 NHL Entry Draft. Makar's cousin Mark Logan also played collegiate hockey from 2015 to 2019 at the Rochester Institute of Technology. Tom Lysiak was his father's cousin. He is of Ukrainian descent on his father's side. Growing up, he was a fan of the hometown Calgary Flames.

Career statistics

Regular season and playoffs

International

Awards and honours

References

External links

 

1998 births
Living people
AHCA Division I men's ice hockey All-Americans
Brooks Bandits players
Calder Trophy winners
Canadian ice hockey defencemen
Colorado Avalanche draft picks
Colorado Avalanche players
Conn Smythe Trophy winners
James Norris Memorial Trophy winners
National Hockey League first-round draft picks
Ice hockey people from Calgary
Stanley Cup champions
UMass Minutemen ice hockey players
Canadian people of Scottish descent
Canadian people of Ukrainian descent